The 1975 Idaho Vandals football team represented the University of Idaho in the 1975 NCAA Division I football season. The Vandals were led by second-year head coach Ed Troxel and were members of the Big Sky Conference, then in Division II. They played their home games at the Kibbie Dome, an indoor facility on campus in Moscow, Idaho.

Season

In the Battle of the Palouse, the Vandals suffered an eighth straight loss to neighbor Washington State of the Pac-8, falling  at Martin Stadium in Pullman on November 15.

This was the first year the Vandals played home games indoors; the Kibbie Dome's arched roof and end walls were constructed in ten months following the 1974 season. Opened in October 1971, it was an unlit outdoor venue known as new Idaho Stadium for four seasons, the last three with artificial turf. Its predecessor Neale Stadium was also without lights, so this was the first season of night football games on campus.

Notable players and coaches
Junior center John Yarno was selected in fourth round of the 1977 NFL Draft played six seasons with the Seattle Seahawks.  Although quarterback Schrom was projected as the starter for 1976 as a redshirt junior, he opted to pursue professional baseball after the 1976 baseball draft. A pitcher, he was a major leaguer for seven seasons and an all-star as a reliever in 1986.

Dennis Erickson, age 28, completed his second year as offensive coordinator, then left for Fresno State; he returned to the UI program in 1982 as head coach.

Division I
Through 1977, the Big Sky was a Division II conference for football, except for Division I member Idaho, which moved down to I-AA in 1978. Idaho maintained its upper division status in the NCAA by playing Division I non-conference opponents (and was ineligible for the Division II postseason).

Schedule

Roster

All-conference
Four Vandal seniors were named to the Big Sky all-conference team: quarterback Dave Comstock, fullback J.C. Chadband, tight end Steve Duncanson, and defensive back Bill Keilty. Chadband and Duncanson were repeat selections and were chosen unanimously. The second team included center John Yarno, tackle Wil Overgaard, split end Tim Coles, and linebacker Mike Siva.

Comstock was the runner-up for conference MVP, a single vote behind running back John Smith of Boise State.

NFL Draft
One Vandal senior was selected in the 1976 NFL Draft, which lasted seventeen rounds (487 selections).

List of Idaho Vandals in the NFL Draft

References

External links
Gem of the Mountains: 1976 University of Idaho yearbook – 1975 football season
Idaho Argonaut – student newspaper – 1975 editions
Official game program: Idaho at Washington State –  November 15, 1975
Postcard of Kibbie Dome interior – opening night – September 27, 1975

Idaho
Idaho Vandals football seasons
Idaho Vandals football